"Rica y Apretadita" is a song by Panamanian reggae singer El General featuring Anayka. The song was released in 1995 and is one of El General's signature songs.

Kumbia All Starz version

"Rica y Apretadita" was later cover by Mexican-American cumbia group A.B. Quintanilla y Los Kumbia All Starz featuring Mexican-American singer Melissa Jiménez. It was released on May 20, 2008 as the second single from their second studio album Planeta Kumbia (2008). Ricky Rick and Melissa Jiménez provide the vocals.

Personnel
 Written by Edgardo A. "El General" Franco
 Produced by A.B. Quintanilla III and Luigi Giraldo
 Lead vocals by Ricky Rick and Melissa Jiménez
 Background vocals by A.B. Quintanilla

Charts

References

External links
 Kumbia All Starz - Rica Y Apretadita (Music Video) at YouTube

1994 songs
1994 singles
2008 singles
Kumbia All Starz songs
Song recordings produced by A. B. Quintanilla
Spanish-language songs
EMI Latin singles